The Rumster Forest transmitting station is a broadcasting and telecommunications facility near the town of Wick, in Caithness, Scotland. It is owned and operated by Arqiva.

It was constructed in 1965 and coverage includes north west Scotland, including Caithness and parts of eastern Sutherland. It also serves coastal areas of Moray and Banffshire.

It carries six digital TV multiplexes.  It also carries national analogue BBC FM radio, including BBC Radio 1, BBC Radio 2, BBC Radio 3, BBC Radio 4, BBC Radio nan Gàidheal and BBC Radio Scotland.

Services by frequency

Analogue radio

Digital radio

Analogue television
Analogue television was switched off during June 2010; BBC Two Scotland was closed on 2 June, and the remaining three on 16 June.

Digital television

Before switchover

See also
List of masts
List of tallest buildings and structures in Great Britain
List of radio stations in the United Kingdom

References

External links
Entry for Rumster Forest transmitting station at The Transmission Gallery
Television Coverage Map
FM Coverage Map

Transmitter sites in Scotland